Petr Buchta (born 15 July 1992 in Brno) is a Czech professional footballer who plays as a centre-back for GKS Tychy.

References

External links 
 

1992 births
Living people
Czech footballers
Czech Republic under-21 international footballers
Czech First League players
FC Zbrojovka Brno players
Footballers from Brno
Association football defenders
Bohemians 1905 players
FC Vysočina Jihlava players
FC Fastav Zlín players
MFK Karviná players
GKS Tychy players
Czech expatriate footballers
Expatriate footballers in Poland
Czech expatriate sportspeople in Poland